Ahmed Aït Ouarab (born 7 August 1979) is a French-Algerian football player who is currently without a club. He last played as a midfielder for JSM Bejaïa in the Algerian Championnat National.

In January 2011, he terminated his contract with JSM Béjaïa with mutual consent after making just 5 appearances in one and a half seasons with the club.

Personal
Aït Ouarab is originally from the town of Toudja, Béjaïa, in the Petite Kabylie region of northern Algeria.

References

1979 births
Living people
People from Bourgoin-Jallieu
Algerian footballers
French footballers
French people of Kabyle descent
Kabyle people
Ligue 2 players
Cypriot Second Division players
Expatriate footballers in Cyprus
ASOA Valence players
Clermont Foot players
FC Martigues players
FC Sète 34 players
Le Mans FC players
JSM Béjaïa players
OGC Nice players
Olympiakos Nicosia players
Algerian expatriates in Cyprus
Association football midfielders
Sportspeople from Isère
Wasquehal Football players
Footballers from Auvergne-Rhône-Alpes